Bacillus firmus is a species of bacteria within the genus Bacillus. Some strains of this species are very alkaline-tolerant and may grow in environments with pH as high as 11.

This species has been recently transferred into the genus Cytobacillus.  The correct nomenclature is Cytobacillus firmus.

References

Further reading

External links
Type strain of Bacillus firmus at BacDive -  the Bacterial Diversity Metadatabase

firmus
Bacteria described in 1933